is a Japanese light novel series written by Tomohiro Matsu and StoryWorks, with illustrations by Kantoku. The series was being worked on by Matsu before his death in May 2016, and he is still credited as the writer. Shueisha have published four volumes since February 24, 2017 under their Dash X Bunko imprint. A manga adaptation by Takatoshi Nakamura and Kiyotsugu Yamagata was serialized in Shueisha's Jump SQ magazine between October 4, 2017 and May 2, 2018. An anime television series adaptation by Hoods Entertainment aired from January 11, 2018 to April 25, 2019.

Plot
The series revolves around Hazuki Kagimura, a socially challenged high school girl who loves stories since childhood. Whenever her life with her new family doesn't play the right cards for her, she instead indulges into the stories she borrows from the local library. One day while returning, she finds a book which she doesn't recall borrowing. She later bumps into a strange, hooded woman who she recognises as the mage from her stories.

While following the woman back to the library to return her belongings, she finds her opening a portal into another world, in which Hazuki gets mysteriously sucked into. Waking up, she finds herself in a mysterious school which is unfamiliar to her. The hooded woman reveals herself to be Shizuka Tsuchimikado, who tells Hazuki that she is in a magic school where girls known as 'madchen' are chosen by magical texts from which the world's stories are born. She also tells Hazuki that she herself has been chosen by the book of Cinderella, and has now become a madchen. In order to master her new abilities and become a full-fledged mage, Hazuki must endure grueling tests and get used to the campus. Thus, her new school life, filled with fantasy and magic, begins.

Characters

Kuzunoha Girl's Magic Academy 

Hazuki is a 15-year-old high school student who is painfully shy and socially inept; and as a result of this, she has no friends or even a love interest. Hazuki is very imaginative and a dedicated fan of fantasy stories - she inherited these traits from her mother, who died when Hazuki was still little. Whenever Hazuki is upset, she immediately finds herself a story book to immerse herself in (a condition Hazuki refers to as "Story Syndrome"). One day after school, Hazuki comes across a cloaked figure and decides to follow her to a library. Hazuki is then transported to another world where she is told that she is a Mage, known as a Madchen in that world. Afterwards, Hazuki transfers to Kuzunoha Girl's Magic Academy to become a proper mage. As the story progresses, Hazuki quits being a Madchen and her Origin was sealed.
Hazuki is contracted to the book of Cinderella at first, before revising the title as Cinderella Doesn't Look Back.

Shizuka is the team leader of Kuzunoha Girl's Magic Academy. She inherited The Tale of Princess Kaguya as a scion of the Tsuchimikado family.

Ariko is Shizuka's childhood friend. The Kasumi family has historically had a servant-master relationship with the Tsuchimikado family. She is contracted to the book of Issun Boshi.

Mai is a shy girl who dislikes malice. She has a black belt in karate and knows Krav Maga. She is contracted to the book of The Grateful Crane.

Sachi is an overconfident girl. She is contracted to the book of Shita-kiri Suzume.

Sugami is the Principal of Kuzunoha Girl's Magic Academy.

Coalition (Allied Union) 

Yumilia is the team leader of the Coalition. She is contracted to the book of Shuten douji.

Charles Giovanni
Charles is Yumilia's airheaded friend. She has no sense of direction, and has a habit of telling unconvincing lies. She is contracted to the book of Puss in Boots.

Molly C. Quinn
Molly is contracted to the book of Pied Piper of Hamelin.

American School 

Lynne is the leader of the American School. She hides her cruel personality with a cutesy facade; she would use any means necessary to succeed. She is contracted to the book of The Little Match Girl.

Angelina comes from the same orphanage as Lynne. She is contracted to the book of Santa Claus.

Russian School 

Maria is the leader of the Russian School. She is contracted to the book of The Gigantic Turnip.

Tatiana is sweet and kind, but is also naive, which makes her prone to trickery and manipulation. Her Origins was damaged from an enemy attack. She is contracted to the book of Ivan the Fool.

German School 

Agathe is the leader of the German School. She is contracted to the book of Der Freischutz.

British School 

Arthur is the leader of the British School. She has the ability to bond with animals. She is contracted to the book of The Legend of King Arthur.

BRICS 

Xuemei is the leader of the Chinese faction of BRICS. She is contracted to the book of The Eight Immortals Depart and Travel to the East.

Mahakali is the leader of the Indian faction of BRICS. She loves beautiful things, and has a queenly demeanor. She is contracted to the book of Ramayana.

Media

Light novels
Märchen Mädchen is written by Tomohiro Matsu and StoryWorks with illustrations by Kantoku. Shueisha published the first volume on February 24, 2017 under their Dash X Bunko imprint; four volumes have been released as of April 2018. The fourth volume is the series' climax.

Manga
A manga adaptation, written by Takatoshi Nakamura and illustrated by Kiyotsugu Yamagata, was serialized in Shueisha's Jump Square magazine from October 4, 2017 to May 2, 2018 and was collected in two tankōbon volumes.

Anime
A 12-episode anime television series adaptation produced by Hoods Entertainment aired from January 11 to March 29, 2018 on AT-X, Tokyo MX and BS11. Hisashi Saito is credited as chief director for the series, Shigeru Ueda is directing the series with Matsu credited for writing the scripts and Yuki Morikawa adapting Kantoku's original character design for animation. Crunchyroll is streaming the series. On March 28, 2018, the series' airing was put on hiatus with the final two episodes' fate unknown. Episodes 11 and 12 were originally scheduled to premiere in December 2018, but they aired on AT-X on April 25, 2019.

Note

References

External links
 

2017 Japanese novels
Anime and manga based on light novels
Crunchyroll anime
Dash X Bunko
Hoods Entertainment
Light novels
Magical girl anime and manga
Magical girl light novels
NBCUniversal Entertainment Japan
Shueisha books
Shueisha manga
Shōnen manga